Baltic Peak is a mountain in the Sierra Nevada foothills of El Dorado County in the U.S. state of California. The nearest city to this peak is Grizzly Flats, a small unincorporated community. Branching off of the Mormon Emigrant Trail, which can be found 3.4 miles from Jenkinson Lake, a dirt path can be found leading to an abandoned lookout on the peak. On the north face, there is a gold mine that was built in 1896. The mine closed by 1907. In 1931, Baltic Peak Lookout, a 80 foot tall steel lookout tower, was built on the mountain at an elevation of 5,046 feet.

References 

El Dorado County, California
Mountains of El Dorado County, California